Nokha is a town and a municipality in the Bikaner district in the Indian state of Rajasthan. It is a planned tehsil of Bikaner. Nokha was established as a krishi mandi (market) by the contemporary king of Bikaner state Maharaja Ganga Singh. Nokha Bhujia(Snacks) is also famous worldwide. It is directly connected to Salasar Balaji temple and Tal Chhapar Sanctuary. It is well connected to all major cities of India by rail and road network . A Famous Shiva temple Senghal Dhora Shiv Temple is located around 30 KM from this town.

Demographics
In 1951, the population was estimated to be 4557, which increased to 86,790 in 2011. The current population is estimated at nearly 135,000 in  August 2021. According to the 2011 census, the literacy rate is 76.67%, which is higher than the state average of 66.11%. Male literacy is around 85.63% while the female literacy rate is 67.03%.

Politics
Biharilal Bishnoi is current M.L.A. from BJP representing Nokha constituency in Rajasthan. He defeated Veteran RameshwarLal Dudi.

NOKHA known as a largest MothMandi in ASIA 
its awarded on national stage for "CLEAN INDIA MISSION" and its known on global stage in industrial sector.

Economy

Nokha has small- and medium-scale manufacturing industries, including guar, gum, groundnut, oil, cement, cotton, refined oil, oil cakes, sanitary wares, lime kiln, mosaic tiles, natural ice-cream, spices, dry vegetables, bags, gum, mineral water, woolen blankets, carpet woolen yarn, milk chilling, metals products, paper, plastic, stuffed foods, chemical products, electric wire, plastic pipes, cement pipes, PVC pipes, electric bulbs, fans, cable, food processing and hair oil. Estimated turnover before covid impact is 100 million Indian rupee per month . It is famous for its crushed ice lolly ( baraf ka gola ) in summer season. Its street food fast food is famous in all nearby towns.

See also
List of villages in Nokha Tehsil

References 

Cities and towns in Bikaner district